is a Japanese football player for Fagiano Okayama.

Career
After attending the Nippon Sport Science University, Wakasa chose to sign for Fukushima United FC in December 2017. He immediately found space in the starting eleven in the opening game of 2018 season against Thespakusatsu Gunma.

Club statistics
Updated to 8 August 2022.

Honours
 Blaublitz Akita
 J3 League (1): 2020

References

External links

Profile at J. League
Profile at Fukushima United FC

1996 births
Living people
Nippon Sport Science University alumni
Association football people from Tokyo
Japanese footballers
J3 League players
Fukushima United FC players
Association football midfielders